Matias Fonseca (born 12 March 2001) is an Italian professional footballer who plays as a forward for Uruguayan club Montevideo Wanderers.

Club career
Born in Naples, Fonseca was formed as a player on Como and Inter Milan youth system.

After his promotion to first team on 2021, Fonseca was loaned to Serie C club Pergolettese. He made his professional debut on 11 September 2021 against Pro Sesto.

On 31 January 2023, Fonseca signed with Montevideo Wanderers for the 2023 season.

International career
Fonseca made his debut for Italy U19 on 15 January 2020 against Spain U19.

Personal life
Matias is son of Daniel Fonseca, former Uruguayan football player. His brother Nicolas is also a footballer.

Career statistics

Club

References

External links
 
 

2001 births
Italian people of Uruguayan descent
21st-century Italian people
Footballers from Naples
Living people
Italian footballers
Italy youth international footballers
Association football forwards
Serie C players
Inter Milan players
U.S. Pergolettese 1932 players
Imolese Calcio 1919 players
Montevideo Wanderers F.C. players
Italian expatriate footballers
Expatriate footballers in Uruguay
Italian expatriate sportspeople in Uruguay